Ng Xuan Hui (born 1977) is a former Singaporean sailor and three-time Singapore National Olympic Council Sportsgirl of the Year in 1991, 1992, and 1993. She was a gold medalist at the 1991 and 1993 Southeast Asian Games.

Ng is the eldest child of International Olympic Committee vice-president Ng Ser Miang.

References 

Living people
1977 births
Singaporean people of Teochew descent
Singaporean female sailors (sport)
CHIJ Saint Nicholas Girls' School alumni
Raffles Junior College alumni
Southeast Asian Games gold medalists for Singapore
Southeast Asian Games medalists in sailing
Competitors at the 1991 Southeast Asian Games
Competitors at the 1993 Southeast Asian Games